is a Japanese retired track and field sprinter who specialized in the 200 metres. His personal best in the event is 20.29 seconds set in Matsumoto in 2001. This is the current Asian U20 record. He won multiple medals with the Japanese 4 × 100 metres relay team.

Personal bests

International competition

References

External links

Yusuke Omae at JAAF 
Yusuke Omae at Fujitsu Track & Field Team  (archived)

1982 births
Living people
Japanese male sprinters
Athletes from Tokyo
Athletes (track and field) at the 2006 Asian Games
Asian Games medalists in athletics (track and field)
Asian Games silver medalists for Japan
Medalists at the 2006 Asian Games
Universiade medalists in athletics (track and field)
Universiade gold medalists for Japan
Medalists at the 2001 Summer Universiade